Prunus africana, the African cherry, has a wide distribution in Africa, occurring in montane regions of central and southern Africa and on the islands of Bioko, São-Tomé, Grande Comore, and Madagascar. It is a canopy tree 30–40 m in height, and is the tallest member of Prunus. Large-diameter trees have impressive, spreading crowns. It requires a moist climate,  annual rainfall, and is moderately frost-tolerant. P. africana appears to be a light-demanding, secondary-forest species.

The bark is black to brown, corrugated or fissured, and scaly, fissuring in a characteristic rectangular pattern. A central vein is depressed on top, prominent on the bottom. The  petiole is pink or red. The flowers are androgynous, 10-20 stamens, insect-pollinated, greenish white or buff, and are distributed in  axillary racemes. The plant flowers October through May. The fruit is a drupe, red to brown, wider than long, two-lobed, with a seed in each lobe. It grows in bunches ripening September through November, several months after pollination.

Ecology

As with other members of the genus Prunus, Prunus africana possesses extrafloral nectaries that provide antiherbivore insects with a nutrient source in return for protecting the foliage.

In addition to its value for its timber and its medicinal uses, Prunus africana is an important food source for frugivorous birds and mammals. Dian Fossey reports of the mountain gorilla: "The northwestern slopes of Visoke offered several ridges of Pygeum africanum .... The fruits of this tree are highly favored by gorillas." East African Mammals reports that stands of Pygeum are the habitat of the rare Carruther's mountain squirrel, and asserts, "This forest type tends to have a rather broken canopy with many trees smothered in climbers and dense tangles of undergrowth." 
It is currently protected under Appendix II of CITES since 16 February 1995 and in South Africa under the National Forest Act (Act 84) of 1998.

Large numbers of trees are harvested for their bark to meet the international demand based on its medicinal qualities. Early studies on the effects of bark harvest showed that the harvest affected population structure, increased mortality, and decreased fecundity. However, quantitative studies to examine specific life history parameters and possible sustainable harvesting practices were begun only recently and 2009). In these later studies, the combined factors of mortalities of a large percentage of reproductive trees (especially the largest ones), highly reduced fruit production, and poor seedling survival seem to suggest a bleak prognosis for future regeneration and long-term persistence of the species in harvested populations.

Uses

Traditional and alternative medicine

The species has a long history of traditional uses. The bark is used in numerous ways - as a wound dressing, a purgative, or an appetite stimulant, and to treat fevers, malaria, arrow poisoning, stomach pain, kidney disease, gonorrhoea, and insanity.

The extract Pygeum is an herbal remedy prepared from the bark of P. africana and is promoted as an alternative medicine for benign prostatic hyperplasia (BPH). A 2016 literature review found that Pygeum offered no benefit. A 2019 review said it showed some evidence of BPH symptom relief.

Other uses
The timber is a hardwood employed in the manufacture of axe and hoe handles, utensils, wagons, floors, chopping blocks, carving boards, bridge decks, and furniture. The wood is tough, heavy, straight-grained, and pink, with a pungent bitter-almond smell when first cut, turning mahogany and odorless later.

Conservation status
The collection of mature bark for its use in traditional medicine and other uses has resulted in the species becoming vulnerable.  P. africana continues to be taken from the wild, but quotas have been awarded by the South African Forestry Department without adequate forest inventories due to some harvesters, spurred on by the high prices, removing too much of the bark in an unsustainable manner. In the 1990s, an estimated 35,000 debarked trees were being processed annually. The growing demand for the bark has led to the cultivation of the tree for its medicinal uses. The species is listed in Appendix II of CITES to regulate its international trade.

Discovery and classification
The name of the remedy, pygeum, comes from the name of the plant, which was discovered to botany by Gustav Mann during his now-famous first European exploration of the Cameroon Range, with Richard Francis Burton and Alfred Saker, in 1861. A letter from Mann to the Linnean Society of London, read by William Jackson Hooker, then director of the Royal Botanic Gardens, Kew, on June 5, 1862, describes the naming of the peaks of the Cameroon Range (such as Mount Victoria, later Mount Cameroon) and the collection of specimens there. The latter were shipped back to Kew for classification, which was duly performed by Hooker and his son, Joseph Dalton Hooker, who had the responsibility of publishing them, as William died in 1865.

When the publication came out the Hookers had named the plant Pygeum africanum, followed by the designation "n. sp.", an abbreviation for nova species. The habitat is listed as "Cameroons Mountains, alt. 7000-7500 feet", which was above the tropical forest and in the alpine grasslands. Hooker notes that another specimen had been "gathered in tropical Eastern Africa" at 3000 feet by Dr. Kirk on an expedition of David Livingstone.

The first publication of the synonym in 1864 had been preceded by publication of the bare name in 1863 in a book by Richard Francis Burton. Evidently Hooker had already made the contents of J. Proc. Linn. Soc., Bot. 7 for 1864 available to some, as Burton mentions the volume and Mann's letter in 1863.

Hooker gives scant hint of why he chose "pygeum", but what he does say indicates it was common knowledge among botanists. Kirk's specimen fruit was "a much-depressed sphere". By this, he undoubtedly meant to reference Joseph Gaertner's genus, Pygeum Gaertn., which innovates pygeum from a Greek word, πυγή, "rump, buttock", because the two lobes of the fruit resemble the human gluteus maximus muscles.

In 1965, Cornelis Kalkman moved Pygeum to Prunus, and this classification has the authority for now. However, a recent cladistic study notes of Pygeum: "its relationships to Prunus remain to be tested by molecular cladistics."

Names
Prunus africana is known by the common names African cherry, pygeum (from its former scientific name, Pygeum africanum), iron wood, red stinkwood, African plum, African prune, and bitter almond.

Palaeobotanic evidence
A 1994/1995 study published in 1997 by Marchant and Taylor did a pollen analysis on and radiocarbon-dated two core samples from montane Mubindi Swamp in Uganda. The swamp is a catchment at  altitude between mountain ridges. It is a "moist lower montane forest" in Bwindi Forest National Park. The investigators found montane Prunus, represented by currently growing P. africana, has been in the catchment continuously since their Pollen Zone MB6.1, dated about 43,000–33,000 years ago.

References

Further reading

External links

 
 

 

africana
Protected trees of South Africa
Trees of Africa
Afromontane flora
Plants used in traditional African medicine
Flora of the Madagascar subhumid forests